Makokou is the regional capital of the Ogooué-Ivindo province in Gabon. Its altitude is 308 m. Its population in 2004 is around 16,600.

The city lies on the Ivindo River and the N4 road.  It grew around iron ore mining and lies near the Ivindo National Park.

Transport 
A branch of the Trans-Gabon Railway was originally planned to terminate in the town, but the route was abandoned for what are often described as political reasons.  At the time, the price of iron ore from the nearby iron ore mines was depressed.  In 2006, proposals to build this branch with a possible extension to other iron ore mines at Mbala, Cameroon are being considered.  At new deep water port at Santa Clara would be part of the project.

The town has one airport, Makokou Airport.

Religion 
Its Cathédrale Notre-Dame des Victoires is the see of the Apostolic Vicariate of Makokou, the country's last Roman Catholic missionary circonscription.

Famous Citizens 

Emmanuel Issoze-Ngondet the one time Prime Minister of Gabon was born in this city.

Climate 
Makokou has a tropical dry savanna climate (Köppen climate classification As).

See also 
 Transport in Gabon
 Railway stations in Gabon
 Iron ore in Africa

References

External links 

 GigaCatholic

Populated places in Ogooué-Ivindo Province
Ivindo River